Parnas is a surname. Notable people with the surname include:

 Aaron Parnas, American lawyer
 David Parnas (born 1941), Canadian software engineer
 Jakub Karol Parnas (1884–1949), Jewish-Polish-Soviet biochemist
 Josef Parnas (born 1950), Danish psychiatrist
 Leslie Parnas (1931–2022), American cellist
 Maya Parnas (born 1974), Transnistrian politician
 Lev Parnas (born 1972), American businessman
 Michal Parnas, Israeli computer scientist

See also